Gyula Katona may refer to:
 Gyula O. H. Katona, Hungarian mathematician and father of Gyula Y. Katona
 Gyula Y. Katona, Hungarian mathematician and son of Gyula O. H. Katona
 Gyula Katona (gymnast), who competed for Hungary in the 1900 Olympics